DeBakey may refer to:
 Lois DeBakey
 Michael E. DeBakey
 Selma DeBakey
 DeBakey forceps
 DeBakey classification system of aortic dissection
 DeBakey High School for Health Professions and the DeBakey High School for Health Professions at Qatar  
 Michael E. DeBakey Veterans Affairs Medical Center in Houston